The Professor (alternatively titled Richard Says Goodbye) is a 2018 American comedy-drama film written and directed by Wayne Roberts. The film stars Johnny Depp, Rosemarie DeWitt,  Danny Huston, Zoey Deutch, Ron Livingston, Odessa Young and Paloma Kwiatkowski.

It had its world premiere at the Zurich Film Festival on October 5, 2018. It was released on May 17, 2019, by Saban Films.

Plot
Richard Brown, an English professor at a New England college, is in the office of his doctor and is told that he has advanced stage 4 cancer of his lungs, which has spread throughout his body and is terminal. His life expectancy is set by the doctor as being six months without treatment, which might be extended to 12–18 months with cancer treatment. Richard is devastated by the news, and walks through town and into a pond fully clothed.

Upon arrival at home for dinner, Richard decides to tell his wife, Veronica and only child, Olivia, the bad news but his daughter announces that she is a lesbian. Richard is relieved as he thought it was something bad, but Veronica dismisses her daughter as going through a phase, which causes Olivia to storm out. Veronica confronts Richard with the fact that she is having an affair with Henry Wright, the dean of the college where Richard works. He accuses her of having no taste. Richard does not break the news; when Veronica asks him what he was going to say, he says that he was concerned that he had overcooked the steaks.

Next day, Richard starts weeding out the students whom he feels are not truly dedicated to English and reading. He offers everyone a C if they walk out the class as being of no interest to them. He suggests they each read a book and then present a lesson on why the book is important. Anyone who doesn't want to do that should walk - and they'll still get a C. Richard is left with a small core group of students. He dismisses them saying he is going on a 72-hour bender, and if anyone knows where to get marijuana, send them to his office. 

At home Richard and his wife agree to live their lives as they please but discreetly to spare their daughter. Veronica asks to try his drugs thinking they are recreational prescription drugs rather than cancer medication. Olivia comes in with her girlfriend and is embarrassed to find both parents drunk and high.

Richard asks his friend, Peter Matthew, who happens to be his department's chairman, to arrange for an immediate sabbatical. Peter tells him that it is impossible on such short notice but Richard presses him. Finally, Richard tells him that he is dying of cancer. Peter says he will try his best to get him the time off work.

Richard vents his frustration to his students and encourages them not to fall into the traps that he has. The students are highly responsive, with one of the students, Danny,  later offering Richard some pot brownies and a sexual tryst in Richard's office. 

Peter persuades Richard to go to a therapeutic group for people with terminal cancer but Richard walks out calling it a circle-jerk and wishing everyone well with their impending deaths. The two end up in a bar where Claire, one of his students arrives. She tells them she is the dean's niece. Peter goes home drunk but Richard stays with Claire and tells her he has cancer. She invites him to slow dance with her.

Richard's reliance on alcohol and recreational drugs becomes progressively worse. In one instance, he passes out and needs to be hospitalized because of his extreme intoxication. He is told to go to Henry's office, presumably for a verbal warning about his behaviour on campus, but he gets one over on Henry by saying he knows about his affair and that he has broken faculty rules by giving Veronica college funds for her sculptures. Soon afterwards, Richard is told he will get his sabbatical.

At a final seminar, Claire observes from her reading that love is a way to try and know another person. Richard likes this and gives his final words (and grades) to his students, he stresses the importance of seizing one's own existence, acknowledging the fact that we are all going to die, and appreciating the (little) time we have left.

At a faculty dinner, Richard is seated at a table at the back of the room, separate from his wife. Richard eloquently berates the dean, tells his wife that for what it’s worth he loves her, and announces to the whole faculty and families that he is dying, which mildly surprises his wife and the other guests.

At home, Olivia comes in crying since her girlfriend has cheated on her with a boy. Richard comforts her and tells her that he is proud of her, then says he is dying. He decides to leave his home and family for his sabbatical. In the final scene, Richard comes across a fork in the road but decides to take  neither and creates an alternative, driving on across a field  into the night, with his dog by his side.

Cast
 Johnny Depp as Richard Brown
 Rosemarie DeWitt as Veronica Sinclair-Brown
 Odessa Young as Olivia Brown
 Danny Huston as Peter Matthew
 Zoey Deutch as Claire
 Devon Terrell as Danny Albright
 Ron Livingston as Henry Wright
 Siobhan Fallon Hogan as Donna
 Linda Emond as Barbara Matthew
 Matreya Scarrwener as Rose
 Paloma Kwiatkowski as Student
 Kaitlyn Bernard as Taylor
 Michael Kopsa as Richard's Doctor

Production
On May 8, 2017, it was announced that Johnny Depp would star in a comedy-drama film Richard Says Goodbye as a college professor in the titular role, to be written and directed by Wayne Roberts following his debut film Katie Says Goodbye, which IM Global would be fully financing. Brian Kavanaugh Jones would produce the film through his Automatik Entertainment along with IM Global's Greg Shapiro. On July 20, 2017, Zoey Deutch was cast in the film to play one of the students of the professor. The rest of the main cast was announced on July 25, 2017, which included Danny Huston, Rosemarie DeWitt, Devon Terrell, and Odessa Young. It was reported that the film would be co-financed by IM Global and Cirrina Studios, with an additional financing by Leeding Media.

Principal photography on the film began on July 25, 2017 in Vancouver.

Release
It had its world premiere at the Zurich Film Festival on October 5, 2018. Prior to that, Saban Films and DirecTV Cinema acquired distribution rights to the film. It was released on May 17, 2019.

Reception

The website's critics consensus reads, "A muddled story populated with thinly written characters and arranged around a misguided Johnny Depp performance, The Professor fails early and often." On Metacritic, the film has a weighted average score of 37 out of 100 based on 12 critics, indicating "generally unfavorable reviews".

Nick Allen of RogerEbert.com gave the film 2 out of 4, while John DeFore of The Hollywood Reporter said that "more an intriguing literary conceit than a credible drama".

References

External links

2018 comedy-drama films
American comedy-drama films
Films about cancer
Films about educators
Films set in universities and colleges
Films shot in Vancouver
IM Global films
Infinitum Nihil films
Saban Films films
2010s English-language films
2010s American films
English-language comedy-drama films